Callionymus tethys, the Tethys dragonet, is a species of dragonet native to the Pacific waters around New Caledonia.

References 

T
Fish described in 1993